Cleome oxalidea is a species of plant in the Cleomaceae family and is found in Western Australia.

It blooms between January and September producing blue-pink-purple flowers.

It is found in the Kimberley, Pilbara, Goldfields-Esperance and Mid West regions of Western Australia growing in stony sandy-loam alluvium.

The species uses  photosynthesis. The  pathway in this species evolved independently from the two other  Cleome species, C. angustifolia and C. gynandra.

References

oxalidea
Plants described in 1859
Flora of Western Australia
Taxa named by Ferdinand von Mueller